Kumylzhensky District is an administrative district (raion), one of the thirty-three in Volgograd Oblast, Russia. Municipally, it is incorporated as Kumylzhensky Municipal District. It is located in the west of the oblast. Its administrative center is the rural locality (a stanitsa) of Kumylzhenskaya. Population:  23,499 (2002 Census);  The population of Kumylzhenskaya accounts for 37.1% of the district's total population.

History
The district was called Podtyolkovsky District from 1970–1994.

References

Notes

Sources

Districts of Volgograd Oblast

